Ronald (Ron) D. Farris is an American politician who served in the Mississippi State Senate from the 45th district from 1996 until 2004.

Farris graduated from University of Southern Mississippi and University of Mississippi. He is currently an attorney with Farris Law Group, PLLC in Madison, MS.

Farris is married to his wife Lisa and has children.

References 

Republican Party Mississippi state senators
Year of birth missing (living people)
Living people